Otto Osen (4 July 1882 – 3 November 1950) was a Norwegian long-distance runner. He was born in Roan, but represented the club SK Brage in Trondheim. He finished 34th in the marathon at the 1912 Summer Olympics. His personal best time was 2:59.25 hours, achieved in 1912.

References

External links
 

1882 births
1950 deaths
People from Sør-Trøndelag
Norwegian male long-distance runners
Norwegian male marathon runners
Athletes (track and field) at the 1912 Summer Olympics
Olympic athletes of Norway
Sportspeople from Trøndelag